Hampton Court usually refers to Hampton Court Palace, a palace and former royal residence in south west London, England.

Hampton Court may also refer to:

Places
 Hampton Court Castle, a manor house in Herefordshire, England
 Hampton Court, Guyana
 Hampton Court, Suriname
 Hampton Court (St. Thomas), Jamaica

Relating to the royal palace
 The Treaty of Hampton Court (1526)
 The Treaty of Hampton Court (1562)
 The Hampton Court Conference (1604), a religious settlement between James I and the English puritans
 Hampton Court Palace Flower Show
 Hampton Court Palace Festival
 Hampton Court railway station, in East Molesey, which serves Hampton Court Palace
 Hampton Court branch line
 Hampton Court Park
 Hampton Court Maze
 Hampton Court Bridge
 Hampton Court Beauties
 Royal Tennis Court, Hampton Court
 Hampton Court House
 Hampton Court and Dittons Regatta

Other uses
 Hampton Court (TV series), Australian television series
 HMS Hampton Court (1678), a ship
 HMS Hampton Court (1709), a ship